Hair is a 1968 album recording of the London cast production of the musical Hair (SD 7002) featuring Paul Nicholas, Vince Edward, Oliver Tobias, Michael Feast, Peter Straker, Annabel Leventon, Linda Kendrick, Marsha Hunt, Sonja Kristina and others conducted by Derek Wadsworth. The album was reissued in 1976 by Reader's Digest with a new cover using the playbill photo of Marsha Hunt.

Track list

"Aquarius" - Vince Edward and Original London Cast
"Donna" - Oliver Tobias and Original London Cast
"Sodomy" - Michael Feast and Original London Cast
"Coloured Spade" - Peter Straker and Original London Cast
"Ain't Got No" - Michael Feast, Peter Straker, Joanne White and Original London Cast
"Air" - Linda Kendrick and Original London Cast
"I Got Life" Paul Nicholas and Original London Cast
"Hair" - Paul Nicholas, Oliver Tobias and Original London Cast
"My Conviction" - Andy Forray and Original London Cast
"Easy To Be Hard" - Annabel Leventon
"Frank Mills" - Sonja Kristina
"Where Do I Go"  - Paul Nicholas and Original London Cast
"Electric Blues" - John Gulliver, Rohan McCullough, Andy Forray, Jimmy Winston, Paul Korda and Original London Cast
"Black Boys" - Collette Kelly, Rohan McCullough, Lucy Fenwick
"White Boys" - Marsha Hunt, Ethel Coley, Joanne White
"Walking In Space" - Original London Cast
"Abie Baby" - Peter Straker, Limbert Spencer, Leighton Robinson
"Three-Five-Zero-Zero - Original London Cast
"What A Piece Of Work Is Man" - Vince Edward, Leighton Robinson 
"Good Morning Starshine" - Annabel Leventon, Linda Kendrick and Original London Cast
"The Bed" - Original London Cast
"Let The Sunshine In" - Annabel Leventon, Marsha Hunt and The Tribe

References

1968 albums
Cast recordings